Peter West (3 May 1931 – 20 June 2010) was an  Australian rules footballer who played with Geelong in the Victorian Football League (VFL).

Notes

External links 

1931 births
2010 deaths
Australian rules footballers from Victoria (Australia)
Geelong Football Club players